Cariniana estrellensis is a species of tree in the family Lecythidaceae. It is native to South America.

References

Trees of Peru
Trees of Brazil
Trees of Bolivia
Trees of Paraguay
estrellensis